The Anti-Hijacking Act, 2016 is an Act of the Parliament of India intended to enforce the Hague Hijacking Convention and the 2010 Beijing Protocol Supplementary to the Convention. The Act repeals and replaces The Anti-Hijacking Act, 1982. The new Act broadens the definition of hijacking to include any attempt to seize or gain control of an aircraft using "any technological means", which accounts for the possibility that the hijackers may not be physically present on board the aircraft.

Background
The Narendra Modi administration believed that The Anti-Hijacking Act, 1982 was not comprehensive enough to deal with modern-day hijack techniques, did not penalize individuals who made false hijack threats, and had weak penalties that did not serve as sufficient deterrent to potential hijackers.

Legislative history
The Anti-Hijacking Bill, 2014 (Bill No. LIII of 2014) was introduced in the Rajya Sabha on 17 December 2014 by the Minister of Civil Aviation, Ashok Gajapathi Raju. The bill was referred to the Parliamentary Standing Committee on Transport, Tourism and Culture on 29 December, and the Committee submitted its report on 11 March 2015. The bill as recommended by the Committee was passed by the Rajya Sabha on 4 May 2016 and by the Lok Sabha on 9 May 2016. The bill received assent from then President Pranab Mukherjee on 13 May 2016, and was notified in The Gazette of India on 16 May 2016. The Act came into force on 5 July 2017.

References

External links
Text of the 1982 Act

Acts of the Parliament of India 2016
Hijacking
Aircraft hijackings in India